Nandu is an Indian actor who works in predominantly Telugu-language films. He debuted with Photo (2006)  and is known for his role in 100% Love (2011).

Career 
Nandu made his lead debut with the thriller film Photo (2006) starring Muktha and Anjali under the stage name of Anand. After playing a negative role in Sukumar's 100% Love, he went on to play the lead roles in several films notably including Ram Gopal Varma's 365 Days (2015) with Anaika Soti. That same year, he played the lead role in Best Actors. Regarding his performance, a critic from The Times of India wrote that "Nandu delivered a decent performance, aptly displaying emotions. His performance has a comfort level that makes his acting seem natural". After starring in several low-budget films, Nandu starred in Sawaari in 2020. The film released to positive reviews with a critic noting that "Nandu comes out of his comfort zone and steals the show right from the get-go".

Personal life 
He is married to Geetha Madhuri with whom he has a daughter.

Filmography 
Actor
All films are in Telugu, unless otherwise noted.

Dubbing artist

References

External links 

Living people
Telugu people
Male actors in Telugu cinema
Indian male film actors
Year of birth missing (living people)
21st-century Indian male actors